Jackson is a town in East Feliciana Parish, Louisiana, United States. The population was 3,842 at the 2010 U.S. census, down from 4,130 in 2000; the 2020 population estimates program determined Jackson had a population of 3,707. It is part of the Baton Rouge metropolitan statistical area.

History
The town of Jackson was founded in 1815 as the seat of justice for Feliciana Parish before the parish was divided into East and West. The town was a major commercial center and a center for education, earning it the title "Athens of the South". Legend holds that the town was originally called "Bear Corners" for the many wild black bears crossing nearby Thompson Creek, and that it eventually took its name from General Andrew Jackson, who reportedly camped there with his troops on the return trip north after the 1815 Battle of New Orleans.

Jackson was the parish seat only until 1824, when Feliciana Parish was split into two parishes, with Clinton selected as the new seat of government in East Feliciana.

Jackson was the location of the College of Louisiana from 1825 until 1845, and then the Methodist-affiliated Centenary College from 1845 until 1908, when it relocated to Shreveport.

The East Louisiana State Hospital was founded in Jackson in 1847.

Geography
Jackson is located on the western edge of East Feliciana Parish at  (30.837588, -91.214436). The town's western border is Thompson Creek, which is also the border with West Feliciana Parish. Louisiana Highway 10 passes through Jackson, leading east  to Clinton and west 12 miles to St. Francisville overlooking the Mississippi River.

Demographics

At the 2000 United States census, there were 4,130 people, 841 households, and 596 families residing in the town. At the 2020 population estimates program, 3,707 people lived in the town. By the 2020 United States census, there were 3,990 people, 750 households, and 488 families residing in the town.

In 2000, the racial makeup of the town was 46.56% White, 52.30% African American, 0.15% Native American, 0.39% Asian, 0.07% from other races, and 0.53% from two or more races. Hispanic or Latino of any race were 0.34% of the population. In 2019, 37.3% of the population were White, 59.9% Black and African American, 1.2% Asian, 0.6% some other race, and 1.1% two or more races.

According to the 2000 U.S. census, were 841 households, out of which 33.5% had children under the age of 18 living with them, 44.8% were married couples living together, 21.6% had a female householder with no husband present, and 29.1% were non-families. 26.9% of all households were made up of individuals, and 10.2% had someone living alone who was 65 years of age or older. The average household size was 2.54 and the average family size was 3.08.

In the town, the population was spread out, with 15.1% under the age of 18, 12.0% from 18 to 24, 44.5% from 25 to 44, 22.0% from 45 to 64, and 6.5% who were 65 years of age or older. The median age was 36 years. For every 100 females, there were 226.0 males. For every 100 females age 18 and over, there were 264.7 males.

The median income for a household in the town was $27,455, and the median income for a family was $32,450. Males had a median income of $20,917 versus $17,896 for females. The per capita income for the town was $12,039. About 18.7% of families and 27.2% of the population were below the poverty line, including 27.8% of those under age 18 and 20.2% of those age 65 or over. The 2019 American community Survey estimated the median household income was $34,063.

Arts and culture
The Republic of West Florida Historical Museum and its  narrow gauge Other points of interest include the Centenary State Historic Site and Feliciana Cellars Winery.

Education

Colleges and universities
A branch of Baton Rouge Community College is presently located in Jackson.

Primary and secondary schools
East Feliciana Parish School Board serves Jackson.

Schools within Jackson include:
 East Feliciana High School
 Jackson Elementary School

Government and infrastructure
The Louisiana Department of Public Safety and Corrections operates the Dixon Correctional Institute in Jackson.

Notable people
 Kendell Beckwith, linebacker for NFL's Tampa Bay Buccaneers
 John Welch Jones, M. D. (1826-1916)
 Junius Wallace Jones, major general of the United States Air Force
 Eddie Robinson, football coach in College Football Hall of Fame
 Danny Johnson, cornerback for NFL's Washington Commanders

See also

 List of towns in Louisiana
 Jackson Historic District

References

External links

 
 

Towns in East Feliciana Parish, Louisiana
Towns in Louisiana
Baton Rouge metropolitan area
Populated places established in 1815
1815 establishments in the United States